Rolling Down the Great Divide is a 1942 American Western film directed by Sam Newfield, written by Milton Raison, and starring Bill Boyd, Art Davis, Lee Powell, Wanda McKay, Glenn Strange and Karl Hackett. It was released on April 24, 1942 by Producers Releasing Corporation.

Plot

Cast          
Bill Boyd as Marshal Bill Boyd
Art Davis as Marshal Art Davis
Lee Powell as Marshal Lee Powell
Wanda McKay as Rita
Glenn Strange as Joe Duncan
Karl Hackett as Pete
Jack Holmes as Sheriff Snowden
Ted Adams as Roger Martin
Jack Ingram as Hank Dale
John Elliott as Lem Bartlett

References

External links
 

1942 films
American Western (genre) films
1942 Western (genre) films
Producers Releasing Corporation films
Films directed by Sam Newfield
American black-and-white films
1940s English-language films
1940s American films